Cambrian Medieval Celtic Studies is a bi-annual academic journal of Celtic studies, which appears in summer and winter. The journal was founded as Cambridge Medieval Celtic Studies in 1981 by Patrick Sims-Williams, who has remained the journal's editor to this day. It was given its present title beginning with volume 26 in 1993.

CMCS Publications has now widened its publishing output to monographs, such as Helen McKee's The Cambridge Juvencus manuscript glossed in Latin, Old Welsh, and Old Irish: Text and Commentary (2000) and Marged Haycock's Legendary Poems from the Book of Taliesin (2007).

See also 
 Book of Taliesin

External links 
 CMCS Publications website
 Contents list of volumes 1 (1981) - 58 (Winter 2009), arranged by volume
 Contents list of volumes 1 (1981) - 50 (2005), arranged alphabetically by author's name
 Contents list 1 (1981) - 40 (2000)

Celtic studies journals
Multidisciplinary humanities journals
Publications established in 1981
Biannual journals
English-language journals